Leoc or LEOC may refer to:

 Late entry officer course
 LEOC Co., a Japanese contract food services company